Nuneaton railway station serves the large town of Nuneaton in Warwickshire, England. The station is managed by West Midlands Trains. It is served by three railway lines: the Trent Valley section of the West Coast Main Line (WCML), the Birmingham-Leicester-Peterborough line and the Nuneaton to Coventry branch line.  
It was known, during the period 1924–1969, as Nuneaton Trent Valley, to distinguish it from the now closed Nuneaton Abbey Street station; many local people still refer to it as Trent Valley.

The station lies on the north-eastern edge of Nuneaton town centre, just outside the ring road.

History

19th and 20th century

The original Nuneaton station was opened on 15 September 1847, when the London and North Western Railway (LNWR) opened the Trent Valley Line; the branch line to Coventry opened in 1850. The original station, like many others on the line, had been designed by John William Livock. A simple two platform structure, it became inadequate to cope with the growing traffic, and was rebuilt on a larger scale with extra platforms in 1873. It was rebuilt and enlarged again in 1915, with its current buildings, which were designed by Reginald Wynn Owen.

In 1873, another line had opened: the Ashby and Nuneaton Joint Railway, to link Ashby-de-la-Zouch and Coalville in order to access the large coal reserves located there. The line was closed to passengers in 1931, but remained open for goods until 1971. Part of it was later reopened as the heritage Battlefield Line.

A second station in Nuneaton, Nuneaton Midland, had been opened by the Midland Railway in 1864 on the line between Birmingham and Leicester. When both the LNWR and Midland Railway became part of the London, Midland and Scottish Railway (LMS) in 1924, both station were renamed; the present station became known as Nuneaton Trent Valley and the former Midland station becoming Nuneaton Abbey Street. Abbey Street station was closed in 1968 and the present station reverted to being called just Nuneaton; it took on the Birmingham to Leicester services.

These were all closed in the 1960s, on implementation of the 1963 Reshaping of British Railways report, leaving only the present station. In addition, on 18 January 1965, the Coventry – Nuneaton line closed to passengers, reopening to passengers in 1988. In 2016, a new station in Nuneaton, 
 was opened on this line.

21st century
In 2004, Network Rail built two new platforms, numbered 6 and 7, on the eastern side of the station. These were built as part of a grade separation project to separate trains on the Birmingham to Peterborough line from those on the West Coast Main Line; this was to avoid the need for Birmingham-Leicester trains to cause conflicting movements by running across the WCML on the level. A disused flyover north of the station, which carries the Birmingham to Peterborough line over the WCML, was restored to use; a connection was built between this and the new platforms, which were dedicated to the Birmingham-Leicester-East Anglia services.

In November 2012, the 0.9 mile Nuneaton North Chord opened to the north of the station. The chord allows freight trains approaching Nuneaton from Felixstowe, via the Birmingham–Peterborough line, to join the northbound WCML after crossing the flyover, allowing them to avoid conflicts with southbound main line trains.

Layout and facilities
The station has a total of seven through platforms, consisting of one side platform (platform 1) on the western side of the station, and three island platforms containing platforms 2 to 7, all of which are linked by a footbridge which has full lift access. The main station building is adjacent to platform one and contains the main facilities, including a staffed ticket office and a cafe shop.

Services

West Coast Main Line

Birmingham to Peterborough Line

All services on this line use platforms 6 and 7.

Coventry to Nuneaton Line
West Midlands Trains also provide an hourly service southbound to  via . This normally uses platform 1.

1975 accident

In the early hours of 6 June 1975, an overnight sleeper train from London to Glasgow derailed and crashed just south of Nuneaton station, killing six people and injuring 38. It was caused when the train ran onto a length of temporary track with a speed restriction at too high a speed. Lighting equipment illuminating a board giving advance warning of the speed restriction failed; this led the driver to wrongly conclude that it had been lifted, so he failed to slow down. One of the locomotives mounted the platform, causing damage to the station. A plaque commemorating the victims of the crash was unveiled at the station in August 2015.

Motive Power Depot

The LNWR opened a small locomotive depot in 1847 which was used until 1878 when it was replaced by a larger facility. The engine sheds were doubled in size in 1888 and enlarged still further in 1892. This was an important freight Depot for the WCML and its connections at Trent Valley Station, also catering for local passenger services. It was located to the south of the station between the main line and that to Coventry. The depot closed 6 June 1966 and has since been demolished.

See also
Bermuda Park railway station
Chilvers Coton railway station
Felixstowe to Nuneaton railway upgrade
Nuneaton Abbey Street railway station
Stockingford railway station

References

External links

 Historical photographs of Nuneaton Station at warwickshirerailways.com

Railway stations in Warwickshire
DfT Category C1 stations
Former London and North Western Railway stations
Railway stations in Great Britain opened in 1847
Railway stations served by Avanti West Coast
Railway stations served by CrossCountry
Railway stations served by West Midlands Trains
Nuneaton
Buildings and structures in Nuneaton
1847 establishments in England
John William Livock buildings
Stations on the West Coast Main Line